Saint-Georges majeur au crépuscule (Eng: Dusk in Venice, San Giorgio Maggiore by Twilight or Sunset in Venice) refers to an Impressionist painting by Claude Monet, which exists in more than one version. It forms part of a series of views of the monastery-island of San Giorgio Maggiore. This series is in turn part of a larger series of views of Venice which Monet began in 1908 during his only visit there.

Versions in Cardiff and Tokyo
One version of San Giorgio Maggiore at Dusk was acquired in Paris by the Welsh art collector Gwendoline Davies. She bequeathed it to the Art Gallery (now National Museum Cardiff) in Cardiff, Wales.  The painting is normally on display there.

The other version is in the Bridgestone Museum of Art in Tokyo.

San Giorgio Maggiore al Crepuscolo: Description of the painting
San Giorgio Maggiore al Crepuscolo is approximately two-by-three feet and painted in oil on canvas. It depicts mysterious buildings that seem to magically appear from the surrounding landscape, they almost seem to float in the background.  The forms are gently inserted, though not enough to disguise their identity.  The painting focuses on the Church of San Giorgio Maggiore with its bell tower rising to the top of the painting. To the right are the faintly visible domes of Santa Maria della Salute and the mouth of the Grand Canal.

Monet and San Giorgio Maggiore
Monet painted the church of San Giorgio Maggiore in six lighting conditions. With this varied approach, the paintings focused on the ‘nature of experience.’
He was particularly impressed by the Venetian sunsets, “these splendid sunsets which are unique in the world.” He had previously been inspired by other sunsets, such as those of Normandy (in Rouen Cathedral and Haystacks, his series of the 1890s) and London (Houses of Parliament).

Viewpoints

Monet and his wife Alice stayed at the Palazzo Barbaro for a couple of weeks, and then moved to the Hotel Britannia, where they stayed until December.
According to Mme. Monet, the Britannia had a view, "if such a thing were possible, even more beautiful than that of Palazzo Barbaro..." 
Monet painted looking out from this hotel, but not, it seems, in the case of this particular painting. Although the view from the hotel included the church of San Giorgio Maggiore, the painting at dusk appears to have been viewed from the waterfront known as the Riva degli Schiavoni, where the island forms a focal point of the view.
Monet was reportedly reluctant to paint from the waterfront. He disliked crowds of tourists and he was also worried about conforming to other artists who were drawn to Venice, such as Renoir or Manet.  San Giorgio Maggiore was a favorite subject for painters, including the proto-Impressionist Turner.

Completion of the paintings in France
Monet felt Venice was a city "too beautiful to be painted", which may be why he returned with many paintings unfinished to Giverny, his home in France.  However, he had already retreated from his earlier practice of painting from life, in front of the subject. He worked on the Venetian scenes at home and the death of his wife Alice in 1911 seems to have been a factor in their completion.

Dispersal
In 1912 the Venice paintings were mainly dispersed as a result of a successful exhibition of twenty-nine canvases. This exhibition, entitled Claude Monet Venise, was held at the gallery Bernheim-Jeune in Paris. The same gallery had hosted exhibitions of the Rouen and London series.

In popular culture 
The painting became familiar in 1999 after its appearance in John McTiernan’s heist film The Thomas Crown Affair. In the film the picture is taken from the Metropolitan Museum of Art.  In actuality, the Metropolitan does not own the painting, although they have another of Monet's Venetian scenes The Doge's Palace Seen from San Giorgio Maggiore.

See also
Other paintings from Monet's San Giorgio Maggiore series are to be seen in Cardiff and Indianapolis Museum of Art

References

 Brownjohn, John and Stephan Koja and Galerie Osterreichische, Claude Monet. New York: Prestel, 1996.
 Koja, Stephan and Katja Miksovsky, Claude Monet: the Magician of Colour. New York: Prestel, 1997.
 National Museum Wales, "San Giorgio Maggiore by Twilight Breaking Dawn," .
 Newcomb, Molly. "San Giorgio Maggiore at Dusk: Claude Monet." (2 April 2012)
 Pissarro, Joachim.  Monet and the Mediterranean, New York: Rizzoli, 1997.
 Tucker, Paul Hayes and George T.M. Shackleford and Mary Anne Stevens, Monet in the 20th Century. New Haven: Museum of Fine Arts, 1998.

External links
 The Davies Sisters Collection

1908 paintings
Paintings of Venice by Claude Monet
Paintings in the collection of National Museum Cardiff
Landscape paintings
Water in art
Churches in art
Paintings of Venice